Érica Rivas (born 1 December 1974) is an Argentine actress. She gained recognition for playing María Elena Fuseneco in the sitcom Casados con hijos (2005–2006) and for her role in the film Wild Tales (2014).

Early life
Rivas was born on 1 December 1974 in Ramos Mejía, Buenos Aires Province. Born into a middle-class home, she is one of four siblings. Her father is an actuary and her mother is a literature professor. After graduating from high school, she pursued a degree at psychology at the University of Buenos Aires. She, however, dropped out in her fourth year to dedicate herself exclusively to acting.

Personal life
Rivas lived with actor Rodrigo de la Serna (1999–2010), with whom she has a daughter.

Filmography

Film

Television

Theatre

References

External links
 
 

1974 births
Argentine film actresses
Argentine people of Spanish descent
Argentine stage actresses
Argentine telenovela actresses
Argentine television actresses
Living people
People from Ramos Mejía
University of Buenos Aires alumni